Mary Wise (born August 8, 1959), née Mary Fischl, is an American college volleyball coach, former player and author. Wise is the current head coach of the Florida Gators women's volleyball team of the University of Florida. In Wise's career at Florida, her Gators teams have won nineteen Southeastern Conference (SEC) regular season championships, and twelve SEC tournament titles. The Gators have also made eight Final Four appearances in the NCAA Tournament, including an appearance in the 2003 and 2017 NCAA Championship finals. With 1,026 career coaching wins through 2022, Mary Wise has the most all-time Division One women's volleyball wins among female head coaches.

Early years 

Wise was born in Evanston, Illinois, in 1959.  Her father Richard Fischl was a dentist, and her mother Lila managed his dental practice.  Wise was one of six children.

College career 

Wise attended Purdue University in West Lafayette, Indiana, where she played for the Purdue Boilermakers volleyball team from 1977 to 1980.  She was a standout setter, and was twice named to the All-Midwest Regional team, while the Boilermakers won two Big Ten Conference championships in 1979 and 1980.  A dean's list student, she graduated from Purdue in 1981 with a bachelor's degree in physical education.

Coaching career

Iowa State
Wise was 21 years old when she became the head coach of the Iowa State Cyclones volleyball team at Iowa State University in Ames, Iowa in 1981; she was also the youngest Division I coach in the history of the National Collegiate Athletic Association (NCAA).  In four seasons as the Cyclones' head coach, she compiled a win–loss record of 81–63.

Kentucky
Wise had been out of coaching for a year and living in Kentucky in 1986, when she was offered an assistant coaching position on the Kentucky Wildcats volleyball program staff at the University of Kentucky in Lexington, Kentucky.  Wise rose from graduate assistant in 1986 to associate head coach in 1990.  During those five seasons, the Wildcats won the SEC championship twice and advanced to the NCAA regional final once.

Florida
Wise was hired as the head coach of the Florida Gators volleyball team at the University of Florida in Gainesville, Florida in 1991.  In the twenty seasons since then, her Gators teams have won nineteen SEC regular season championships.  She is one of only two coaches in conference history in any sport, men's or women's, to win as many as nineteen conference titles.  From 1994 to 2004, the Gators did not lose a regular season SEC match—a feat unmatched by any school, ever.

In 2003, Wise's Florida team won 105 straight games during the course of the season, eclipsing the previous NCAA record by 36 games. This record has since been broken by Penn State who won 111 consecutive games.  Since 1991, Florida has amassed 571 victories in matches—more than any other school in the nation.

On the forefront of increasing awareness and exposure for volleyball, Wise has ushered in a philosophy of innovation when it comes to rules changes and volleyball youth opportunities.

Her expertise has led to numerous appointments on international coaching staffs. In the summer of 2004 Wise took her own team on a twelve-day, three-nation tour of Western Europe as the Gators faced several national and junior national teams.  In May 2006, Wise guided the USA Volleyball A2 Team at the U.S. Open Championships as the volleyball community became one of the first groups to compete in a large-scale event in New Orleans since Hurricane Katrina.

Wise's Gators have also shown a commitment to playing an active role in community leadership and involvement.  An annual tradition, each year members of the Gators  volleyball team visit children at nearby Shands Hospital during the Thanksgiving holiday, while players also participate in the Goodwill Gators program.  In 2003, Wise helped raise $7,500 for the Children's Miracle Network after more than 4,000 Gator fans packed the O'Connell Center for a match against South Carolina.

Wise picked up the number one recruiting class for the class of 2008, as she signed the Gatorade National Player of the Year and top recruit, Kelly Murphy, as well as five other recruits ranked in the top 50.

Achievements and records
Wise  became the first ever coach to win 100 straight games and was the first female coach to coach in the NCAA national championship final, as well as being the first female coach to coach in more than one NCAA Final Four. She became the first female coach in NCAA Division I history to win 15 conference titles in the first 15 seasons at one school, thus becoming the only coach to ever win 130 consecutive regular season conference matches. She is the first coach to ever win 90 percent of matches in the first 16 seasons at one school and she reached the 500 win plateau faster than any other Division I female coach.

Awards and accolades 

 Thirteen-time winner of the SEC Coach of the Year Award (1991–1993, 1995–1996, 1998–2002, co-winner in 2007, and 2014, co-winner in 2017)
 Two-time winner of American Volleyball Coaches Association National Coach of the Year (1992, 1996, 2017)
 American Volleyball Coaches Association All-Time Great Coach (2006)
 Past president of American Volleyball Coaches Association

Personal 

Wise lives in Gainesville, Florida with her husband, Mark Wise, and their two children, Matt and Mitchell.

Coaching Record

Bibliography 

Volleyball Drills for Champions. Human Kinetics Publishers (1998) 
Volleyball Coaching Bible (Part IV: Individual Skills and Team Tactics, Chapter 13: Serving)

Videos 

Foundations for Successful Volleyball (1999).  .

See also 

 Florida Gators
 History of the University of Florida
 List of college women's volleyball coaches with 700 wins
 List of Purdue University people
 University Athletic Association

References

Bibliography 

 Mary Wise, Volleyball Drills for Champions (1998).  .

External links 

  Mary Wise – Official biography at GatorZone.com

gators.

1959 births
Living people
American volleyball coaches
American women's volleyball players
Purdue Boilermakers women's volleyball players
Florida Gators women's volleyball coaches
Kentucky Wildcats women's volleyball coaches
Iowa State Cyclones women's volleyball coaches
Sportspeople from Evanston, Illinois
Female sports coaches
Volleyball players from Indiana
Sportspeople from Gainesville, Florida